Thrippunithura State assembly constituency is one of the 140 state legislative assembly constituencies in Kerala state in southern India.  It is also one of the 7 state legislative assembly constituencies included in the Ernakulam Lok Sabha constituency. As of the 2021 assembly elections, the current MLA is K. Babu of Indian National Congress.

Local self governed segments
Thrippunithura Niyama Sabha constituency is composed of the following 8 wards of the Kochi Municipal Corporation (Palluruthy zone) in Kochi Taluk, and 2 Municipalities and 2 Gram Panchayats in Kanayannur Taluk:

All of the above 8 wards are included in Kochi Taluk.

Members of Legislative Assembly 
The following list contains all members of Kerala legislative assembly who have represented the constituency:

Key

Election results

Niyamasabha Election 2021 
There were 2,11,581 registered voters in the constituency for the 2021 Kerala Niyamasabha Election.

Niyamasabha Election 2016 
There were 1,98,245 registered voters in the constituency for the 2016 Kerala Niyamasabha Election.

Niyamasabha Election 2011 
There were 1,71,652 registered voters in the constituency for the 2011 election.

See also
 Thrippunithura
 Ernakulam district
 List of constituencies of the Kerala Legislative Assembly
 2016 Kerala Legislative Assembly election

References 

Assembly constituencies of Kerala

State assembly constituencies in Ernakulam district